The Boabeng-Fiema Monkey Wildlife Sanctuary is found at Boaben and Fiema, twin communities 22 kilometers away from the Nkoranza North District of the Bono East region, Ghana. The 4.4 kilometer square (km2) forest, believed to have been created in the 1970s, houses many trees, birds, reptiles, deer and monkeys, two of which are the Geoffrey's Pied Colobus and Campbell Mona monkey.

It is a home for about 700 monkeys. The village is a community where monkeys and human beings live together. The inhabitants in the village always leave food outside their homes for the animals. The monkeys see human beings as their own.

The monkeys in the sanctuary are protected by the traditional laws on the area. The sanctuary serves as a national tourist site and is accessible by road.

References

Bono East Region
Protected areas of Ghana